Frome is a town in Somerset, England.

Frome may also refer to:

Relating to the Somerset town 
 Frome railway station
 Frome Community College
Frome Festival
Frome Town F.C.
 Frome (UK Parliament constituency) (1832–1950)
 Somerton and Frome (UK Parliament constituency)

Places

Australia
 Electoral district of Frome, a state electoral district in South Australia

England
 Bishop's Frome, village and civil parish in eastern Herefordshire
 Frome St Quintin, village in west Dorset
 Frome Vale, city council ward in Bristol
 Frome Vauchurch, village in west Dorset

Jamaica
 Frome, Jamaica, a small town

Rivers 
Australia
Frome River, in the Lake Eyre basin in South Australia
United Kingdom
 River Frome, Bristol
 Frome Valley Walkway
 River Frome, Dorset
 River Frome, Herefordshire
 River Frome, Somerset
 River Frome, Stroud

People
Andrea Frome, American computer scientist
Edward Charles Frome (1802–1890), British Army officer, surveyor and colonial administrator
 Lenny Frome (died 1998), gambling author and video poker expert
 Milton Frome (1909–1989), American actor
 Sir Norman Frederick Frome (1899–1982), ornithologist

Other
 Ethan Frome, 1911 novel by Edith Wharton
 Frome Road, Adelaide, a road in the state capital of South Australia.
 Frome Sports Club, multi-use stadium in Savanna-la-Mar, Jamaica

See also
Lake Frome (disambiguation)
Froom (disambiguation)
Froome (disambiguation)